Count Luchino Nefaria is a supervillain appearing in American comic books published by Marvel Comics.

Publication history

The character first appears in The Avengers #13 (February 1965), and was created by Stan Lee and Don Heck.

Fictional character biography
Luchino Nefaria is a wealthy Italian aristocrat and traditionalist that also desires greater wealth and power, driving him to join the Maggia criminal organization. The recently formed Avengers superhero team, however, thwart many of his plans and force a direct conflict, so Nefaria lures the Avengers to his castle on the pretense of a charity event, and places the group in suspended animation, using images which threaten to take control of America. After he releases them, the Avengers become suspicious of him after hearing they are wanted and they cannot remember what happened at the castle. They go to the castle, however nearly all of them are paralyzed by Nefaria's gas. Meanwhile, the Teen Brigade were captured by Nefaria, and when they tried to contact the Avengers were thrown in a dungeon which would place them into suspended animation if they touched the walls. Captain America gets into the castle without touching the ground, other Avengers, or walls, and freed the Teen Brigade, who gave the antidote to the Avengers. Captain America was also paralyzed, and with his hands and feet attached to ropes he was suspended between floor and ceiling, where Nefaria mocked him, saying he would be a hero for capturing him. However, Iron Man then burst through the wall. Neferia was defeated and deported after an officer heard him confess to being in the Maggia. In retaliation, Nefaria then unsuccessfully attempts to destroy Iron Man, and then suffers yet another defeat when stopped by the mutant X-Men team.

Nefaria reappears several years later and attempts to take control of the United States base NORAD, but is stopped by the X-Men once again. Nefaria attempts to escape in a plane which is attacked by the X-Man Thunderbird. The plane then explodes, killing Thunderbird and injuring Nefaria.

Now virtually destitute and discredited, Nefaria hires the supervillains Living Laser, Power Man and Whirlwind to form the second Lethal Legion. The group rob several banks, and unwittingly finance an experiment Nefaria has created in a bid to become superhuman. Employing the former scientific adviser to Heinrich Zemo, Nefaria devises a means of temporarily amplifying the abilities of the Lethal Legion, and then sends them into combat against the Avengers. The effect, however, is temporary and once defeated their combined abilities are drained by Nefaria who possesses them magnified a hundredfold. After a long and protracted battle, Nefaria is finally defeated.

Nefaria is then kept in isolation and under observation by the Avengers, and it is discovered that the process to empower him makes Nefaria immortal but vulnerable as his body reconfigures itself. Whitney Frost, also known as Madame Masque and the daughter of Nefaria, attempts to find a cure for what is believed to be his deteriorating condition. She hires the Ani-Men to attack Avengers Mansion and free her father. While battling Iron Man, Nefaria's life-support system is severed and his weakened form is crushed by a stored Jupiter Landing Vehicle.  Nefaria briefly reappears some time later as a corpse reanimated by the Grim Reaper. Grim Reaper directs Nefaria to attack the Avengers, but loses control soon afterwards and Nefaria dies once again.

Nefaria eventually reappears, but in an ionic humanoid form, and constantly requires ionic energy to sustain his existence. He battles Iron Man and later Captain America and Ka-Zar in the Savage Land as he attempts to find sources of energy. Nefaria then plans to detonate an ionic bomb, which will transform millions of people into an ionic state which he can then control, perceiving it as the best way to guarantee that he receives the respect that he feels he deserves. Nefaria gains control of the ionic heroes Wonder Man and Atlas who he intends to use to kill the Avengers, but he is stopped by the combined efforts of the Avengers, fellow superhero team the Thunderbolts and Madame Masque, Masque using a weapon she had developed to disrupt Nefaria's own ionic energy. He is next seen as an inmate of The Raft, a prison for supervillains, and escapes when Electro stages a mass breakout.

Following the "Siege" storyline, Madame Masque sought out her father to help the Hood after Loki took back the Norn Stones. The New Avengers capture John King (Hood's cousin) and use him to track the Hood and Madame Masque. After a battle with Count Nefaria, they capture the villains and bring all four of them to Maria Hill to place them under arrest.

Nefaria returns within the pages of Moon Knight, having established himself as the new Kingpin of Los Angeles. He kills Echo in battle, and is later apprehended by the Avengers. Also in L.A., Daken attempts to kill him but fails. Later, back in New York, he is summoned by Nightmare to destroy The Unbeatable Squirrel Girl in dreams, but is bested at finger-counting, and leaves.

During the "Secret Empire" storyline, Count Nefaria appears as a member of the Army of Evil and took part in the attack on Manhattan in retaliation for what happened at Pleasant Hill during "Avengers: Standoff!".

During the "Spider-Geddon" storyline, Count Nefaria is engaging Superior Octopus who counters his ionic abilities by having his tentacles charged with energy that disrupts ionic fields. Count Nefaria breaks free from the tentacles as Superior Octopus plans to threaten his mother Vitto Nefaria and his relatives Giuseppe Nefaria and Paolo Nefaria who he is spying on with his Octobots. Count Nefaria takes his leave and vows to return when Superior Octopus' role as San Francisco's protector destroys him.

In a lead-up to the "Sins Rising" arc, Count Nefaria using a wheelchair later forms his latest incarnation of the Lethal Legion with Grey Gargoyle, Living Laser, and Whirlwind in a plot to target the Catalyst. At Empire State University, Dr. Curt Connors reveals the Catalyst to the crowd when the Lethal Legion attacks. While Grey Gargoyle and Whirlwind attack the people present, Living Laser helps Count Nefaria to operate the Catalyst. Spider-Man shows up and has a hard time fighting them due to the fact that his mind was focused on what a revived Sin-Eater did to Overdrive. Sin-Eater shows up and starts using the same gun he used on Overdrive on Whirlwind and Grey Gargoyle while taking their powers. Immobilizing Spider-Man with Grey Gargoyle's powers, Sin-Eater proceeded to do the same thing to Living Laser and Count Nefaria. All four of them were sent to Ravencroft where they started to act like model inmates. Norah Winters was allowed by Norman Osborn to interview them about Sin-Eater. Count Nefaria expressed remorse over his actions. When a riot occurs at Ravencroft, Count Nefaria informs Norman Osborn that Sin-Eater is coming for him.

As a side-effect of Sin-Eater's suicide upon copying Madame Web's precognition revealed that Kindred was using them, Count Nefaria and the rest of the Lethal Legion regained their sins and are among the villains that went on a rampage.

Powers and abilities
Count Nefaria was a normal human with a genius intellect long before he'd gained his superpowers. He was a well versed scientist, inventor, theoretical physicist, adept strategist and organizational leader with deep ties to the underworld through his own crime family, The Maggia. Such a taciturn criminal mastermind is he that upon his first appearance he'd easily turned the American public and the world over against The Avengers in their first meeting. It wasn't until being subjected to a process perfected by one of Baron Heinrich Zemo's scientists Dr. Kenneth Sturdy that he was granted the combined powers of the villains the Living Laser (energy projection), Power Man (strength), and Whirlwind (speed), amplified a hundredfold. Because of this, Nefaria is one of the physically strongest known humans in the Marvel Universe. He has toppled a 40-story building with little effort, withstood a blow from Wonder Man without flinching, and fought an enraged Thor to a standstill with no apparent damage from strikes of his hammer, even stopping it with his bare hand.

The character then aged until his body evolved, eventually shifting into pure ionic form. This increasing his already insurmountable abilities while granting him new ones, such as the creation and manipulation of ionic energy for teleportation, hand and eye blasts, ionic force punches, and/or controlling other ionic beings (and potentially gamma mutates) via parasitically siphoning their energies. Through this he can also convert others into ionic energy beings as well, in a vampiric fashion, turning them into his superpowered thralls. As such, Nefaria is effectively immortal and virtually indestructible. He also has the power of flight, when before he could only leap great distances. He's also showcased a new power, creating energy constructs to surround his opponents in ionic energy and move them about telekinetically. He has withstood simultaneous attacks by multiple teams of superheros at once. Although it is possible to deplete Nefaria's ionic energy in combat by forcing him to expend it faster than his body can replenish it, Giant-Man calculated that it would take three weeks of constant combat – without even giving Nefaria time to pause for breath – for even the combined forces of the Avengers and the Thunderbolts to deplete his ionic energy reserves completely in that manner. However, Madame Masque has developed a weapon that disrupts Nefaria's ionic energy.

As a head of the Maggia, Count Nefaria also has access to vast amounts of technology, munitions, and gadgetry developed by his Research and Development department. Much of this, he had a hand in crafting, such as the Electro-disc, Time Transcender Ray, Visio-Projector, Worldwide Electro-scanner, The Dream Master and the Ionic Bomb. Being of Italian nobility, Count Nefaria has also inherited a vast fortune, which he has used in conjunction with his intellect for the purpose of furthering his revenue and power. To that end he would use it for the hiring of super villains, scientists and expendable workforce in his organization branch for the creation of inventions that were far in the advances of modern science, give himself super powers or broaden the reach of his connections to both the unlawful and political circuit of the world. Being an aristocrat of understandable stature and influence, Nefaria also has claims to diplomatic immunity and as such he cannot be tried outside of his own home country.

Other versions

House of M
In the House of M reality, Count Nefaria is the leader of the Maggia. He and the Maggia were slaughtered by Magneto's Sentinels for plotting against Magneto.

JLA/Avengers
In JLA/Avengers, Count Nefaria is seen in #4 among the other villains enthralled by Krona to defend his stronghold. He is shown fighting Superman in a panel spreading across two-pages.

Old Man Logan
In the pages of Old Man Logan, the elderly Logan awoke on Earth-616 and had a flashback to where Count Nefaria, Red Skull, Baron Blood, Spiral, and Whirlwind were standing over the dead bodies of the superheroes the day when the villains rose and the heroes fell.

What If?
Count Nefaria appears in the What If? story "What If the X-Men Died on their First Mission?" at the time he and the Ani-Men have taken control of NORAD (Uncanny X-Men #94-95). With the X-Men having perished in a prior fight with Krakoa, the former X-Man Beast hastily assembles a mutant team to combat Nefaria. While attempting to flee, Nefaria's jet is brought down by Theresa Cassidy. Though Nefaria escapes, Theresa avoids mainstream Thunderbird's fate when her teammate James Proudstar catches her before she falls to her death.

In other media

Television
 Count Nefaria appears in the "Iron Man" segment of The Marvel Super Heroes, voiced by Chris Wiggins.
 Count Nefaria appears in Iron Man: Armored Adventures, voiced by Russell Roberts. This version sports a cane that shoots electricity and is the only known leader of the Maggia. Throughout the series, he and the Maggia battle the Mandarin's gang, the Tong, and Iron Man and assists former members, the Guardsmen, in fraudulently establishing themselves as heroes before Justin Hammer captures Nefaria and makes him a test subject for a zombification gas he developed.

Film
Count Nefaria makes a non-speaking cameo appearance in Avengers Confidential: Black Widow & Punisher.

Video games
 Count Nefaria appears in Lego Marvel's Avengers.
 Count Nefaria appears in Marvel: Avengers Alliance.

References

External links
 Count Nefaria at Marvel.com
 Marvel Directory: Count Nefaria
 Leader's Lair: Count Nefaria

Characters created by Don Heck
Characters created by Stan Lee
Comics characters introduced in 1965
Fictional counts and countesses
Fictional gangsters
Fictional inventors
Fictional Italian people
Fictional physicists
Marvel Comics characters who can move at superhuman speeds
Marvel Comics characters with accelerated healing
Marvel Comics characters with superhuman strength
Marvel Comics male supervillains
Marvel Comics mutates
Marvel Comics scientists